"Give Me More Time" is a song by the English hard rock band Whitesnake from their 1984 album Slide It In. Written by vocalist David Coverdale and Mel Galley.

Background
The song was released as the second single from Slide It In in January 1984. "Give Me More Time" reached number 29 on the UK Singles Chart. A music video was also shot for the single from BBC's TV's ''Top of the Pops.

Track listing

7" single (UK)
"Give Me More Time" - 3:41 (Coverdale/Mel Galley)
"Need Your Love So Bad" - 3:14  (Little Willie John, Mertis John Jr.)

Personnel

 David Coverdale – lead vocals, percussion
 Micky Moody – guitars
 Mel Galley – guitars, backing vocals
 Colin Hodgkinson – bass
 Cozy Powell – drums
 Jon Lord – keyboards

Charts

References

External links 

1984 singles
Whitesnake songs
Songs written by David Coverdale
1984 songs
Liberty Records singles
British hard rock songs
Song recordings produced by Martin Birch